The 2006 President's Cup was the 56th season of the President's Cup, a knock-out competition for Maldives' top 4 football clubs. Victory Sports Club were the defending champions, having defeated New Radiant in last season's final.

Broadcasting rights
The broadcasting rights for all the matches of 2006 Maldives President's Cup were given to the Television Maldives.

Qualifier
Top 4 teams at the end of 2006 Dhivehi League will be qualified for the President's Cup.

Final qualifier

 

Notes
Note 1: Match was abandoned at 2–2 in the 67th minute due to riots.
Note 2: Replay was held behind closed doors.

Semi-final Qualifier

 

Notes
Note 3: Match was abandoned in 88th minute with scores at 3–2 when Island FC walked off. Result stood.

Semi-final

Final

References
 President's Cup 2006 at RSSSF

President's Cup (Maldives)
Pres